The 2010 Vuelta a Burgos was the 32nd edition of the Vuelta a Burgos road cycling stage race, which was held from 4 August to 8 August 2010. The race was won by Samuel Sánchez of the  team.

General classification

References

Further reading

Vuelta a Burgos
2010 in road cycling
2010 in Spanish sport